Laurel Park may refer to:

Laurel Park, Richmond, California, a neighborhood
Laurel Park, New Jersey
Laurel Park, North Carolina
Laurel Park, Virginia
Laurel Park (race track), a horse racing facility in Laurel, Maryland
Laurel Park Incorporated, a landfill site in Naugatuck, Connecticut